Thomás Grob (born 11 January 1977) is a Chilean alpine skier. He competed in three events at the 1998 Winter Olympics.

References

1977 births
Living people
Chilean male alpine skiers
Olympic alpine skiers of Chile
Alpine skiers at the 1998 Winter Olympics
Sportspeople from Santiago
20th-century Chilean people